In mathematics, combinatorial topology was an older name for algebraic topology, dating from the time when topological invariants of spaces (for example the Betti numbers) were regarded as derived from combinatorial decompositions of spaces, such as decomposition into simplicial complexes. After the proof of the simplicial approximation theorem this approach provided rigour.

The change of name reflected the move to organise topological classes such as cycles-modulo-boundaries explicitly into abelian groups. This point of view is often attributed to Emmy Noether, and so the change of title may reflect her influence. The transition is also attributed to the work of Heinz Hopf, who was influenced by Noether, and to Leopold Vietoris and Walther Mayer, who independently defined homology.

A fairly precise date can be supplied in the internal notes of the Bourbaki group. While topology was still combinatorial in 1942, it had become algebraic by 1944. This corresponds also to the period where homological algebra and category theory were introduced for the study of topological spaces, and largely supplanted combinatorial methods.

Azriel Rosenfeld (1973) proposed digital topology for a type of image processing that can be considered as a new development of combinatorial topology. The digital forms of the Euler characteristic theorem and the Gauss–Bonnet theorem were obtained by Li Chen and Yongwu Rong. A 2D grid cell topology already appeared in the Alexandrov–Hopf book Topologie I (1935).

See also
Hauptvermutung
Topological combinatorics
Topological graph theory

Notes

References 

Algebraic topology
Combinatorics

es:Topología combinatoria